The White Rose (Spanish:La rosa blanca) is a 1954 Cuban-Mexican drama film directed by Emilio Fernández and Íñigo de Martino and starring Roberto Cañedo, Gina Cabrera and Julio Capote. It portrays the life of the nineteenth century Cuban poet Jose Marti, a leading advocate of the country's independence from Spain.

Cast 
 Roberto Cañedo as José Julián Martí Pérez
 Gina Cabrera as Carmen Zayas Bazán
 Julio Capote as José Julián Martí Pérez joven
 Julio Villarreal as Mariano Martí
 Dalia Íñiguez as Leonor Pérez
 Andrés Soler as Miguel García Granados
 Raquel Revuelta as Carmen Miyares de Mantilla
 Rebeca Iturbide as Rosario de la Peña
 Arturo Soto Rangel as José María Izaguirre
 Rafael Alcayde as Francisco Zayas Bazán
 Miguel Inclán as Manuel Altamirano
 Manuel Arvide as Manuel Mantilla
 Raúl Díaz as Coronel Jiménez de Sandoval
 Antonio Bravo as Español Republicano
 Manuel Noriega as Médico de Nueva York

See also 
 List of Cuban films

References

Bibliography 
 Carl J. Mora. Mexican Cinema: Reflections of a Society, 1896-2004. McFarland, 2005.

External links 
 

1954 films
1950s historical drama films
Mexican historical drama films
Cuban historical films
1950s Spanish-language films
Films directed by Emilio Fernández
Films set in Cuba
Films set in the 19th century
1954 drama films
Cuban black-and-white films
Mexican black-and-white films
1950s Mexican films